The American International School Vietnam (AISVN) in Ho Chi Minh City (Saigon), Vietnam, was formed in 2006 with the purpose of providing an American education for Vietnamese students. , it enrolled roughly 900 students in grades K-12 of which 90% are Vietnamese.

Curriculum
American International School uses English as the medium of instruction. It offers the International Baccalaureate Diploma Program.

Ownership and finances
Intellectual Resources Management Co., which owns the school, is also the owner of the Saigon Institute of Technology (SaigonTech). AISVN operates in Nhà Bè District, Ho Chi Minh City. The current campus was opened in August 2014 with previous campuses in Bình Thạnh District, District 1  and District 10. All campuses besides from the one in Nhà Bè are now closed.

Accreditation
American International School, Saigon is accredited by the IBO to teach the PYP, MYP and IBDP programs. The school is also accredited by both CIS and WASC.

References

External links

American International School website

Saigon
High schools in Ho Chi Minh City
Educational institutions established in 2006
Saigon
International Baccalaureate schools in Vietnam
2006 establishments in Vietnam